is a TV station affiliated with Japan News Network (JNN) in Takaoka, Toyama.  It is broadcast in Toyama Prefecture. Established October 1, 1990.

TV channel

Digital Television 
 Toyama 32ch JOJH-DTV

Tandem office 
Fukumitsu 60ch
Unazuki 44ch
Takaoka-Futagami 61ch
Hosoiri 57ch
Ōyama-omi 57ch

Program

External links
 The official website of TulipTelevision 

Japan News Network
Television stations in Japan
Television channels and stations established in 1990
1990 establishments in Japan
Mass media in Takaoka, Toyama